Henri Bource (25 March 1934 – 4 September 1998) was a Dutch-Australian scuba diver, underwater filmmaker, musician and shark attack survivor who lived and worked in Australia. He is best known for his film Savage Shadows in which he recreated the scene of a great white shark removing his left leg.

Early life 
Bource was born in Rotterdam and emigrated to Australia as a teenager in 1954. He learned to use an aqualung with his father and trained as a graphic artist.

Shark attack 
Bource was attacked by what is believed to have been a 2.4 metre long great white shark off Lady Julia Percy Island in Australia in November 1964. He was 29 years old at the time, and was living in Hawthorn East. He lost his left leg but survived the attack and went on to retell the story in his 1969 documentary film, Savage Shadows. He continued to dive, wearing a modified diving fin on the stump of his left leg. During the 1970s he made a short film for BHP and Esso called Reef of Steel and appeared in Island Treasure in 1981. He was interviewed at various times about his shark attack, including by Peter Luck in 1979.

Music career 
Bource was a saxophonist and band leader of the Henri Bource Allstars. He also played with the Thunderbirds (1960–62), The Planets and The Johnny Donohue Quartet.

References 

1934 births
1998 deaths
Shark attack victims
Underwater filmmakers
Dutch emigrants to Australia
Australian amputees
Australian underwater divers
Australian saxophonists
20th-century saxophonists
20th-century Australian male musicians
20th-century Australian musicians